Palmetto Bay may refer to:
Palmetto Bay, Florida
Palmetto Bay, Barbados

See also
Palmetto (disambiguation)